Home Room is an independent film starring Erika Christensen, Busy Philipps and Victor Garber. It premiered in the Taos Talking Pictures Film Festival on 12 April 2002, and made its limited theatrical release on 5 September 2003.

Plot
A school massacre leaves seven students and the shooters parents dead and one student named Deanna Cartwright (Christensen) seriously injured. The shooter himself is dead, shot by police during the confrontation after the actual shooting, and the only witness (and possible suspect) is Alicia Browning (Philipps), a gothic student who is now under the attention of the detective in charge of the case, Det. Martin Van Zandt (Garber).

The school principal asks Alicia to visit Deanna in the hospital. Right away, their differences are evident. Alicia is an outsider from a single-parent family who shuns the society that similarly shuns her, while Deanna is from a wealthy family, gets good grades and is popular with her classmates.

At first, Deanna seems upbeat and cheerful, but soon it becomes apparent that beneath this exterior are psychological scars left behind by the incident. Alicia starts to empathize with her, as she herself is battling her own demons as well, including a previous suicide attempt. Through these similar emotional bonds, the two form an unlikely friendship as they both try to cope with their separate psychological problems.

Cast
Busy Philipps as Alicia Browning
Erika Christensen as Deanna Cartwright
Victor Garber as Det. Martin Van Zandt
Raphael Sbarge as Det. Macready
Ken Jenkins as Police Captain
Holland Taylor as Dr. Hollander
Arthur Taxier as Mr. Browning
James Pickens Jr. as Principal Robbins
Constance Zimmer as Assistant Kelly
Richard Gilliland as Mr. Cartwright
Roxanne Hart as Mrs. Cartwright

Home Room and Columbine
Even though he started writing the script before the event, director Paul F. Ryan later based the film on the Columbine High School massacre; the film was released only three years after the incident. Ryan and Christensen visited Columbine High School before the film's release to speak to students, faculty and parents, who received a private screening of the film. The response was generally positive and Ryan has since returned as a guest of the school twice.

While a large part of the public wishes to figure out why such massacres happen, some have lauded Home Room simply for not explaining why they happen; the film does not place blame on violent video games or movies, and concludes that finding a single reason for these events is impossible.

In addition, the film focuses on what happens to the community long after the news crews have left. In an interview, Ryan explains, "What changed my mind was watching what happened in Littleton afterwards. CNN reported the story for about two weeks, then left. The rest of America moved on, but the people in Littleton didn’t. How do you start living your life again after such a terrible thing?"

Reception
On review aggregator website Rotten Tomatoes, the film holds an approval rating of 55%, based on 22 reviews, with an average rating of 5.6/10. The site's critics consensus reads "Honorable intentions and some strong performances aren't enough to keep Home Room from occasionally slipping into distractingly didactic messaging". On Metacritic, the film holds 43 out of a 100 based on 10 reviews, indicating "mixed or average reviews".

References

External links

Official production company site for the film 

American independent films
Works about the Columbine High School massacre
Films about school violence
2002 drama films
American drama films
2002 independent films
2000s English-language films
2000s American films